

Medal summary

Men

Women

References

2003 Games of the Small States of Europe
2003 in swimming
2003